The 2019–20 Duleep Trophy was the 58th season of the Duleep Trophy, a first-class cricket tournament in India. It took place in August and September 2019, starting the 2019–20 domestic cricket season in India. India Blue were the defending champions. Unlike the previous three seasons, the tournament was played as day games, played with a red ball. The final was initially announced as a day/night match with the pink ball. However, the final was changed and was played as a day game. The change was attributed due to players' preference.

The first match, between India Blue and India Green, saw only 49 overs bowled, all on the first day. Rain and a wet outfield prevented any further play, with both teams awarded one point each in the drawn match. The second match, between India Red and India Blue, also ended in a draw with India Red securing enough points to be the first team to advance to the final. During the match, Jalaj Saxena completed the double of scoring 6,000 runs and taking 300 wickets in first-class cricket. The third match, between India Green and India Red, was also drawn. India Green progressed to the final due to a superior quotient.

India Red won the tournament, beating India Green by an innings and 38 runs in the final.

Squads

Points table

 Top two teams advance to the Final.

Fixtures

Round-robin

Final

References

External links
 Series home at ESPN Cricinfo

Duleep Trophy seasons
Duleep Trophy
Duleep Trophy
Duleep Trophy Final